The European Union (EU) and the Syrian Arab Republic have signed two agreements between each other. However, due to the Syrian government's crack down on its opposition, the EU is imposing an embargo on Syria. Since 2011, the EU has supported the opposition Syrian National Council and calls for the present government to stand down. Since 2012 it has recognised the opposition as legitimate representatives of the Syrian people.

In early 2012, several EU member states, including France, the United Kingdom, Italy and the Netherlands, closed their embassies in Damascus.

Agreements
In 1977 the EU and Syria signed a Cooperation Agreement which governs relations, which serves as the foundation for EU-relations. 2004 and 2008 saw further bilateral agreements between the EU and Syria. Syria also joined the EU's Union for the Mediterranean (and previously the Barcelona Process) and the European Neighbourhood Policy - but does not fully benefit pending the application of the EU-Syria Association Agreement which was signed in 2009, and was suspended from the Union for the Mediterranean in 2011.

Since 2011
Following the Syrian civil uprising in spring 2011 and the resulting escalation of violence and human rights violations, the EU suspended bilateral cooperation with the Syrian government and froze the draft Association Agreement. Since then, the EU has also suspended the participation of Syrian authorities in its regional programmes. The European Investment Bank (EIB) has suspended all loan operations and technical assistance. The EU established and then expanded targeted sanctions, including an arms embargo, asset freeze and travel ban on government members, and an oil embargo. Syria consequently suspended its membership of and participation in the Union for the Mediterranean. The EU Delegation in Syria remained open until December 2012. In December 2012, the EU accepted the National Coalition for Syrian Revolutionary and Opposition Forces as "legitimate representatives" of the Syrian people.

The EU is a member of the Friends of Syria Group.

Trade
Before the war, the EU was Syria's largest trading partner with €3.6 billion worth of EU goods exports to Syria and €3.5 billion of Syrian exports to the EU. Total trade was worth €7.18 billion in 2010 and the EU is Syria's largest trading partner with 22.5% of its trade (Syria is the EU's 50th). Bilateral trade has contracted since the war to €1.45 billion in 2013, a drop of 91% of exports from Syria and of 61% of exports from the EU compared to 2011. However, the volume of trade has started to rise in recent years, e.g. in 2018 it was 50% higher than their low in 2016.

References

External links
 EU delegation to Syria
 European Commission Memo on Syria 2014
 

 
European Union
Third-country relations of the European Union